Grenada Olympic Committee (IOC code: GRN) is the National Olympic Committee representing Grenada.

See also
Grenada at the Olympics
Grenada at the Commonwealth Games

External links 
Grenada Olympic Committee 

Grenada
Grenada
Olympic
Grenada at the Olympics
1984 establishments in Grenada
Sports organizations established in 1984